Bananer – bland annat (English: Bananas - among other) is a music album recorded by the Swedish-Dutch folk singer-songwriter Cornelis Vreeswijk in 1980.

Track listing
Music and lyrics by Cornelis Vreeswijk unless otherwise noted

"The Bananrepublikens sång" – 2:28
"Samba för Pomperipossa" – 2:50
"Systemblues" – 3:43
"När det brinner i Lögnfabriken" – 2:48
"Syndomblues" – 3:06
"Blues för IRA" – 2:35
"Sist jag åkte jumbojet blues" – 3:22
"Blues för Victor Jara" – 2:45
"Blues för Almqvist" – 1:25
"Blues för en arbetarekvinna som hängt sig" – 2:47
"Blues för Fatumeh" – 2:38
"Bruna bönor complet" – 3:09
"Blues för Macbeth" – 2:22
"En resa" – 2:20

Personnel
 Cornelis Vreeswijk - vocal, guitar
 Conny Söderlund - guitar, vocal, rhythm instruments
 Owe Gustavsson - bass

Cornelis Vreeswijk albums
1980 albums